Aurora shooting may refer to:

 1993 Aurora, Colorado shooting
 2012 Aurora, Colorado shooting
 Aurora, Illinois shooting